Otto Abraham Lasanen (14 April 1891 – 25 July 1958) was a featherweight Greco-Roman wrestler from Finland. He won a bronze medal at the 1912 Summer Olympics and placed fourth at the 1914 unofficial European Championships. In 1917 he won a Russian title, as Finland was part of Russia then. Lasanen was a car driver by profession.

References

External links
 

1891 births
1958 deaths
Wrestlers at the 1912 Summer Olympics
Finnish male sport wrestlers
Olympic wrestlers of Finland
Olympic bronze medalists for Finland
Olympic medalists in wrestling
Medalists at the 1912 Summer Olympics
People from Kuopio
Sportspeople from North Savo
19th-century Finnish people
20th-century Finnish people